Le Val-Saint-Germain is a commune in the Essonne department in Île-de-France in northern France.

Inhabitants of Le Val-Saint-Germain are known as Val-Saint-Germinois.

See also
Communes of the Essonne department

References

External links

Mayors of Essonne Association 

Communes of Essonne